Marg Osburne (December 29, 1927 – July 16, 1977) was a Canadian country, folk and gospel singer. She was a recipient (posthumously) of the ECMA Stompin' Tom Connors award.

Early life
She was born in Moncton, New Brunswick and received her vocal training as a member of a community choir.

Career
When she was 17 her cousin made her a bet that she did not have the nerve to answer a newspaper advertisement for a female vocalist for CKCW in Moncton. Osburne answered the ad and got the job. Osburne explained in a later interview that she took the job because she "needed money to go to the Movies".

Don Messer was travelling through Moncton in 1947 and heard Osburne singing on CKCW, billed as "The Girl From the Singing Hills". He hired her to fill in for Charlie Chamberlain who was recovering from an automobile accident. She soon became the group's lead singer.

Don Messer and His Islanders were then broadcasting on CFCY out of Charlottetown, PEI thrice-weekly beginning in 1939 and the show was broadcast nationwide by the CBC.

Osburne and Chamberlain became regular performers on the show and made a number of recordings. The group toured each summer. They mounted a national tour in 1967 as part of Canada's Centennial, playing 66 shows across the country.

1956 brought about the first appearance of The Islanders on television when CFCY radio launched CFCY-TV. When Messer made the move to Halifax in 1958, most of the band followed - including Osburne. From being occasional TV guests, the band began a summer series called The Don Messer Show on August 7, 1959 as a replacement for Country Hoedown broadcast on CBC television. The show continued in the fall as Don Messer's Jubilee. Osburne remained with the show throughout the 1960s, winning a wide audience across the country as one of the show stars, and enlarging her fan base dramatically.

After Messer died in 1973, Osburne began a second career as a nightclub singer. She performed frequently in the Western Provinces and Territories of Canada. During this period she recorded three songs for Jack Boswell's Marathon label, "Albert County Soil", "Falling Leaves", and "Blues Comin' 'Round". "Falling Leaves" is also the only song she wrote herself.

Death
Osburne continued to perform until July 16, 1977, when she collapsed during a concert in Rocklyn, Ontario and died from the heart attack before she reached the hospital, exactly five years after Charlie Chamberlain's death. She was 49 years old.

Discography

Albums

Singles

References

Bibliography
 Large, Betty Rogers and Crothers, Tom, Out of Thin Air, Applecross Press, Charlottetown, Prince Edward Island, 1989. 

1927 births
1977 deaths
Apex Records artists
Canadian women country singers
Musicians who died on stage
Musicians from Moncton
Nightclub performers
20th-century Canadian women singers